Hope is an unincorporated community and census-designated place (CDP) located within Hope Township in Warren County, New Jersey, United States, that was defined as part of the 2010 United States Census. As of the 2010 Census, the CDP's population was 195.

Geography
According to the United States Census Bureau, the CDP had a total area of 0.615 square miles (1.593 km2), including 0.614 square miles (1.592 km2) of land and 0.001 square miles (0.002 km2) of water (0.10%).

Demographics

Census 2010

References

Census-designated places in Warren County, New Jersey
Hope Township, New Jersey